These 175 species belong to Leia, a genus of fungus gnats in the family Mycetophilidae.

Leia species

  Leia aculeolusa Wu, 2002 c g
  Leia albicincta Meijere, 1924 c g
  Leia albicoxa Enderlein, 1910 c g
  Leia amabilis Williston, 1900 c g
  Leia amapaensis Lane, 1959 c g
  Leia ampulliforma Wu, 2002 c g
  Leia andirai Lane, 1950 c g
  Leia annae (Lindner, 1958) c g
  Leia annulicornis (Brunetti, 1912) c g
  Leia apicalis (Kertesz, 1902) c
  Leia apinagei Lane, 1950 c g
  Leia arcuata Brunetti, 1912 c g
  Leia arsona Hutson, 1978 c g
  Leia aruaci Lane, 1950 c g
  Leia autumnata Ostroverkhova & Grishina, 1974 c g
  Leia barbarae (Lindner, 1958) c g
  Leia basilewskyi Tollet, 1956 c g
  Leia beckeri Landrock, 1940 c g
  Leia biamputata Edwards, 1933 c g
  Leia bicolor (Fisher, 1939) c
  Leia bilineata (Winnertz, 1863) c g
  Leia bilunula Wiedemann, 1828 c g
  Leia bimaculata (Walker, 1848) c g
  Leia biparitta Lynch Arribalzaga, 1892 c g
  Leia bipunctata Fisher, 1939 c g
  Leia bisetosa Edwards, 1928 c g
  Leia biumbaensis Tollet, 1956 c g
  Leia bivittata Say, 1829 i c g b
  Leia borealis Winnertz g
  Leia borgmeieri Lane, 1959 c g
  Leia bururiensis Tollet, 1956 c g
  Leia cayapoi Lane, 1950 c g
  Leia cincta (Coquillett, 1895) i c g
  Leia cincticauda Enderlein, 1910 c g
  Leia circumfera Fisher, 1939 c g
  Leia collarigera Enderlein, 1910 c g
  Leia completa (Kertesz, 1902) c g
  Leia concinna Williston, 1896 c g
  Leia continua Tollet, 1956 c g
  Leia costaricensis Fisher, 1940 c g
  Leia crucigera Zetterstedt, 1838 c g
  Leia cuneola (Adams, 1903) i c g
  Leia cylindrica (Winnertz, 1863) c g
  Leia decora (Loew, 1869) i c g
  Leia delobeli Matile, 1993 c g
  Leia determinaticollis Enderlein, 1910 c g
  Leia dichroma Freeman, 1951 c g
  Leia diplechina Wu, 2003 c g
  Leia disgrega Edwards, 1933 c g
  Leia diversipes Edwards, 1933 c g
  Leia divesicornis (Kertesz, 1902) c g
  Leia dryas Johannsen, 1912 i c g
  Leia elegans (Kertesz, 1902) c g
  Leia falculata Edwards, 1933 c g
  Leia fasciata (Kertesz, 1902) c g
  Leia fascipennis Meigen, 1818 c g
  Leia fisherae Shaw, 1950 c g
  Leia flavipennis Lastovka & Matile, 1974 c g
  Leia flavobrunnea Brunetti, 1912 c g
  Leia flavolimbata (Brunetti, 1912) c g
  Leia flavoscutellata Lynch Arribalzaga, 1892 c g
  Leia fontana Chandler, 2004 c g
  Leia fulva (Walker, 1856) c g
  Leia fuscicalcar Edwards, 1928 c g
  Leia fuscicornis Edwards, 1941 g
  Leia gaudchaui (Lindner, 1958) c g
  Leia graeca Bechev, 1997 c g
  Leia guangxiana Wu, 1999 c g
  Leia guaycurusi Lane, 1950 c g
  Leia hemiata Garrett, 1925 i c g
  Leia humeralis (Brunetti, 1912) c g
  Leia hungarica Sevcik & Papp, 2003 c g
  Leia hyalina (Coquillett, 1905) i c g
  Leia immaculata (Giglio-Tos, 1891) c g
  Leia incompleta Curran, 1928 c g
  Leia indica (Brunetti, 1912) c
  Leia innotata Enderlein, 1910 c g
  Leia insignis Brunetti, 1912 c g
  Leia intermissa Tollet, 1956 c g
  Leia interrupta (Kertesz, 1901) c g
  Leia ishitanii Sasakawa, 1994 c g
  Leia iturupensis Zaitzev, 2001 c g
  Leia jeanneli (Edwards, 1914) c
  Leia junai Lane, 1950 c g
  Leia kamijoi Sasakawa, 1964 c g
  Leia kaszabi Lastovka & Matile, 1974 c g
  Leia leucocera Edwards, 1933 c g
  Leia lineola (Adams, 1903) i c g
  Leia longiseta Barendrecht, 1938 c g
  Leia longwangshana Wu, 2002 c g
  Leia maculosa (Strobl, 1900) c g
  Leia major Edwards, 1933 c g
  Leia malleolus Freeman, 1954 c g
  Leia martinovskyi Sevcik & Papp, 2003 c g
  Leia melaena (Loew, 1869) i c g
  Leia melanoptera Ostroverkhova, 1977 c g
  Leia monoleuca Edwards, 1933 c g
  Leia montanosilvatica Zaitzev, 1994 c g
  Leia muhavuraensis Tollet, 1956 c g
  Leia nepalensis Plassmann, 1977 c g
  Leia ngorongoroensis Vanschuytbroeck, 1965 c g
  Leia nigricans Tollet, 1956 c g
  Leia nigricauda Edwards, 1933 c g
  Leia nigricornis Van Duzee, 1928 g
  Leia nigripalpis Edwards, 1928 c g
  Leia nigriventris Edwards, 1932 c g
  Leia nigrocornis Van Duzee, 1928 i c g
  Leia nigronitida (Edwards, 1914) c g
  Leia nigrospleniata Lynch Arribalzaga, 1892 c g
  Leia nitens Williston, 1896 c g
  Leia notabilis (Edwards, 1914) c g
  Leia oblectabilis (Loew, 1869) i g b
  Leia oliveirai Lane, 1959 c g
  Leia opima (Loew, 1869) i c g b
  Leia orientalis Vanschuytbroeck, 1965 c g
  Leia padana Chandler, 2004 c g
  Leia paranensis Edwards, 1933 c g
  Leia paulensis Edwards, 1933 c g
  Leia pauliani Matile, 1969 c g
  Leia pedifer Edwards, 1933 g
  Leia pedifera Edwards, 1933 c g
  Leia picta Meigen, 1830 c g
  Leia picticornis (Kertesz, 1902) c g
  Leia piffardi Edwards, 1925 c g
  Leia pilosa Okada, 1938 c g
  Leia plaumanni Lane, 1959 c g
  Leia plebeja Johannsen, 1912 i c g
  Leia poeciloptera Philippi, 1865 c g
  Leia punctata Bellardi, 1862 c g
  Leia punctiformis Fisher, 1939 c g
  Leia ravida Wu, 1999 c g
  Leia rubrithorax Okada, 1939 c g
  Leia rufiptera Ostroverkhova, 1977 c g
  Leia rufithorax Freeman, 1951 c g
  Leia rwankeriensis Tollet, 1956 c g
  Leia salobrensis Edwards, 1941 c g
  Leia schmidti Fisher, 1939 c g
  Leia schnusei Edwards, 1933 c g
  Leia setosa Matile, 1973 c g
  Leia setosicauda Edwards, 1933 c g
  Leia smithi Edwards, 1933 c g
  Leia spinifer Edwards, 1933 g
  Leia spinifera Edwards, 1933 c g
  Leia stelviana Kurina, 2008 c g
  Leia stigmatica Edwards, 1925 c g
  Leia stonei Lane, 1958 c g
  Leia striata (Williston, 1893) i c g
  Leia subfasciata (Meigen, 1818) c g
  Leia sublunata (Loew, 1869) i c g b
  Leia submaculipennis Freeman, 1954 c g
  Leia subtrifasciata (Strobl, 1906) c g
  Leia thomensis Edwards, 1934 c g
  Leia tropicalis Fisher, 1939 c g
  Leia truncatovenosa Enderlein, 1910 c g
  Leia umbrosa Caspers, 1991 c g
  Leia uncinata Ostroverkhova & Grishina, 1974 c g
  Leia unicolor (Winnertz, 1863) c g
  Leia varia Walker, 1848 i c g b
  Leia ventralis Say, 1824 i c g b
  Leia winthemi Lehmann, 1822 c g
  Leia yangi Wu, 1997 c g
†  Leia aberrans Statz, 1944 g
†  Leia crassipalpis (Meunier, 1904) g
†  Leia crassiuscula (Förster, 1891) g
†  Leia curvipetiolata (Meunier, 1904) g
†  Leia exhumata Statz, 1944 g
†  Leia frequens (Loew, 1850) g
†  Leia gracillima (Förster, 1891) g
†  Leia longipalpis (Meunier, 1904) g
†  Leia longipes (Förster, 1891) g
†  Leia longipetiolata (Meunier, 1904) g
†  Leia miocenica Cockerell, 1911 g
†  Leia platypus (Loew, 1850) g
†  Leia vetusta (Meunier, 1919) g

Data sources: i = ITIS, c = Catalogue of Life, g = GBIF, b = Bugguide.net

References

Leia